Duguay-Trouin was a  74-gun ship of the line of the French Navy.

Career 
Construction of Duguay-Trouin was started in 1810 at Le Havre, but her timber was transferred to Cherbourg after September 1810 and she was completed there.

She was struck in 1826.

Notes, citations, and references

Notes

Citations

References
 

Ships of the line of the French Navy
Téméraire-class ships of the line
1813 ships